Brigadier Colin Frederick Blackden (1897 – November 1986) was an officer in the British Army during the Second World War.

Blackden was acting commander of several brigades of the King's African Rifles during the East African Campaign.

Command history
 Acting Commanding Officer, 2nd (East Africa) Infantry Brigade, East Africa – 1940
 Acting Commanding Officer, 22nd (East Africa) Infantry Brigade, detached to 11th African Division – 1941
 Commanding Officer, Lines of Communication Area, East Africa – 1941 to 1942
 Commanding Officer 27th (N Rhodesia) Infantry Brigade, East Africa – 1942
 Commanding Officer, Sub-Area, East Africa – 1943 to 1944

See also
 East African Campaign
 Order of Battle, East African Campaign (World War II)

References

External links
Generals of World War II

1897 births
British Army brigadiers of World War II
1986 deaths
South Wales Borderers officers
King's African Rifles officers